In probability theory, a Fleming–Viot process (F–V process) is a member of a particular subset of probability measure-valued Markov processes on compact metric spaces, as defined in the 1979 paper by Wendell Helms Fleming and Michel Viot. Such processes are martingales and diffusions.

The Fleming–Viot processes have proved to be important to the development of a mathematical basis for the theories behind allele drift.
They are generalisations of the Wright–Fisher process and arise as infinite population limits of suitably rescaled variants of Moran processes.

See also 
 Coalescent theory
 Voter model

References 

Fleming, W. H., Michel Viot, M. (1979) "Some measure-valued Markov processes in population genetics theory" (PDF format) Indiana University Mathematics Journal, 28 (5), 817–843.
Ferrari, Pablo A.; Mari, Nevena  "Quasi stationary distributions and Fleming Viot processes" , Lecture presentation

Markov processes
Statistical genetics
Martingale theory